Tuckahoe is a disused train station located in the Tuckahoe section of Upper Township, Cape May County, New Jersey, United States. The station was built in 1894 and was added to the National Register of Historic Places on June 22, 1984. The Cape May Seashore Lines offers excursion trips from Tuckahoe to Richland.

See also
Wilson Brothers & Company
Operating Passenger Railroad Stations Thematic Resource (New Jersey)
National Register of Historic Places listings in Cape May County, New Jersey

References

External links

Railway stations in the United States opened in 1894
Railway stations in Cape May County, New Jersey
Railway stations on the National Register of Historic Places in New Jersey
Former railway stations in New Jersey
Former Pennsylvania-Reading Seashore Lines stations
National Register of Historic Places in Cape May County, New Jersey
Upper Township, New Jersey
New Jersey Register of Historic Places